Bacciocchi is a surname of Italian origin. Notable people with the surname include:

Antonello Bacciocchi (1957-2007), Sammarinese politician
Ferrante Bacciocchi (17th century), Italian painter
Félix Baciocchi (disambiguation) , several people
Nicola Bacciocchi (born 1971), retired Sammarinese footballer
Simone Bacciocchi (born 1977), Sammarinese footballer

Italian-language surnames